Frances Hunt Throop (1860–1933) was an American painter. She was known for her portraiture and still life painting.

Biography
Throop was born in 1860 in New York City. She studied at the Art Students League of New York. She was a member of the Brooklyn Art Association and the National Association of Women Painters and Sculptors.

Throop exhibited her work at the Palace of Fine Arts at the 1893 World's Columbian Exposition in Chicago, Illinois.

Family
Throop's grandfather was George B. Throop, a New York state senator and later Michigan state representative; her great uncle Enos T. Throop was the governor of New York from 1829 to 1832. In 1894, she married lawyer Samuel H. Ordway (1860-1934) (brother of businessman Lucius Pond Ordway, nephew of composer John Pond Ordway) and ended her painting career. Samuel Ordway and Frances Throop Ordway had two children, Frances Hanson Ordway (1898–1903) and Samuel H. Ordway Jr. (1900–1971). Samuel Jr. was, like his father, an advocate of civil service reform, serving on civil service commissions on both the state and federal levels. He was also active in conservation; the Samuel H. Ordway, Jr. Memorial Preserve in South Dakota was created in 1975 in his memory by The Nature Conservancy. Frances Throop Ordway died in 1933 in East Hampton, New York.

Gallery

References

External links
 

1860 births
1933 deaths
American women painters
19th-century American women artists
19th-century American painters